The Golden Horse Award for Best Leading Actress is given at the Golden Horse Film Awards.

Superlatives 

The following individuals received two or more Best Actress awards:

The following individuals received four or more Best Actress nominations:

Winners and nominees

1960s

1970s

1980s

1990s

2000s

2010s

2020s

References

External links 
  
  

Golden Horse Film Awards
Film awards for lead actress
Awards established in 1962